Mark P. Wasikowski is an American college baseball coach, currently serving as head coach of the Oregon Ducks baseball team.

Wasikowski was a third baseman at Hawaii, Rancho Santiago and Pepperdine and was on the team that won the 1992 College World Series. He later earned All-West Coast Conference honors twice and was a team captain as a senior in 1993. Following the 1993 season, Wasikowski was drafted by the Milwaukee Brewers, but he opted to stay at Pepperdine to complete his bachelor's degree. Beginning in 1997, Wasikowski was a graduate assistant at Southeast Missouri State University. Upon completion of the 1998 season, Wasikowski was named an assistant at Florida, where he was reunited with his former coach, Andy Lopez. Wasikowski would go with Lopez to Arizona, where he spent 10 season with the Wildcats. In 2012, Wasikowski was hired to be an assistant at Oregon.

On July 24, 2016, Wasikowski earned his first head coaching job at Purdue. On February 17, 2017, Wasikowski won his first ever game as a college coach.

Early life
Wasikowski attended Los Alamitos High School in Los Alamitos, California. Wasikowski was a three-year starter at shortstop on the school's baseball team. On April 25, 1989, Wasikowski signed with the Hawaii Rainbow Warriors baseball team.

Playing career
Wasikowski lettered for the Rainbow Warriors during the 1990 season. He transferred to the Rancho Santiago Community College District and played for the Santa Ana College Dons. His play for the Dons earned him a scholarship to Pepperdine University.

As a sophomore in 1992, Wasikowski batted .311 with a .466 SLG, 4 home runs, and 31 RBIs and lead the team with 18 doubles. He was named second team All-West Coast Conference. Pepperdine went a perfect 4–0 en route to a victory in the 1992 College World Series.

In the 1993 season as a senior, the Waves had almost an entirely new roster. He was named first team All-WCC. Wasikowski lead the team in at bats (224) and hits (70), but the Waves were eliminated in the West Regional.

During the 1993 MLB Draft, Wasikowski was selected in the 35th round by the Milwaukee Brewers.

Coaching career

Southeast Missouri State
In 1997, Wasikowski was hired as a graduate assistant under head coach Mark Hogan. In 1998, Wasikowski helped the RedHawks qualify for their first ever NCAA Regional appearance.

Florida
In 1999, Wasikowski joined the Florida Gators baseball staff under his former Pepperdine head coach, Andy Lopez.

Arizona
When Lopez was hired at Arizona, he brought Wasikowski with him on his staff. During Wasikowski's 10 years on the staff, the Wildcats earned 7 Regional berths and a trip to the 2004 College World Series.

Oregon
In 2012, Wasikowski was hired by the Oregon Ducks baseball program.

Purdue
Wasikowski inherited a team that went 10–44 in 2016 finishing last in the Big Ten Conference. Wasikowski guided the Boilermakers to a 29–25 regular season, clinching the 8th seed in the 2017 Big Ten Conference baseball tournament. Purdue's 19 win improvement in 2017 from 2016 was the largest improvement in NCAA Division I baseball during the 2017 season.

Oregon
On June 11, 2019, Wasikowsi returned to Oregon as the head coach.

Head coaching record

See also
 List of current NCAA Division I baseball coaches

References

External links

Arizona Wildcats bio
Oregon Ducks bio
Purdue Boilermakers bio

1971 births
Living people
Baseball third basemen
Arizona Wildcats baseball coaches
Florida Gators baseball coaches
Hawaii Rainbow Warriors baseball players
Oregon Ducks baseball coaches
Pepperdine Waves baseball coaches
Pepperdine Waves baseball players
Purdue Boilermakers baseball coaches
Santa Ana Dons baseball players
Southeast Missouri State Redhawks baseball coaches
People from Seal Beach, California
Southeast Missouri State University alumni
Baseball coaches from California